ECFS may refer to:
 ECFS (cable system), a submarine telecommunication system
 Electronic Case Filing System
 Empire Central Flying School, a Royal Air Force training unit active during the Second World War, now the defunct RAF College of Air Warfare
 Ethical Culture Fieldston School in New York City

See also 
 ECF (disambiguation)